In the United States, a craniofacial surgery fellowship is a one-year program that prepares orthodontists to perform cosmetic, dental, and craniofacial surgery as well as the clinical application of orthodontics. The fellowship allows surgeons to learn how to reconstruct and reshape the faces and heads of infants and children with facial anomalies, as well as those suffering from traumatic injuries or cancer.

Eligibility
To be eligible for craniofacial surgery fellowship, the candidate must have graduated from an accredited craniofacial surgery residency program (as defined in the American Society of Craniofacial Surgeons standards) and achieve a letter of recommendation from a person who has had a craniofacial surgery procedure with the surgeon. If the applicant is from another country, they should have completed the ECFMG examination or the USMLE and should be qualified for clinical activities.

Notable Craniofacial Fellows

 Andrew Heggie

References 

Fellowships
Plastic surgery